Jorge Cristian Acuña Concha (born 31 July 1978 in Ovalle), also known by his nickname Kike Acuña, is a Chilean football manager and former footballer who played as a midfielder.

Club career
Born in Ovalle, IV Region of Coquimbo, Acuña joined Santiago–based club Unión Española youth set-up where was promoted to the first adult team in 1999. After spending a season with the Spaniards, in January 2000, he moved to powerhouse Universidad Católica where he helped the club to win the 2002 Torneo Apertura, being a key playing in the title earning.

In 2002, Acuña signed a contract with Dutch club Feyenoord. Following a Feyenoord Reserve match on 15 April 2004, he and other Feyenoord players, including Robin van Persie, were attacked by AFC Ajax hooligans. Acuña was taken to the hospital with head, neck and rib injuries. Then he joined on loan to RBC Roosendaal to play the 2005–06 Eredivisie season. After completing 24 league appearances, Acuña finished his spell at North Brabant and later was released from Feyenoord in January 2006 which didn't renew his contract.

After months as a free agent he was on trial at English clubs Blackburn Rovers and Wigan Athletic. However, on 23 January 2007, Acuña finally signed for Universidad de Chile, Católica's cross town rivals. He arrived to the club during an institutional crisis, only playing 16 league games and then being fired by coach Arturo Salah after missing a training.

On 8 August 2007, it was reported that Acuña moved to South African side Mamelodi Sundowns of the Premier Soccer League. After two seasons playing at The Brazilians, he decided to left them after differences with club's chairman Patrice Motsepe who according Acuña discriminated him for be white.

After leaving Unión San Felipe, on 2018 he played for both Rebeldes F.C. and Las Higueras de Santa María at amateur level.

Managerial career
After coaching the under-17 football team of the commune Santa María, on 2020 he began his managerial career as manager of Unión San Felipe at under-17 level. In November 2020, after Unión San Felipe changed his technical staff, Acuña became assistant coach of Héctor Roco, the manager of the first team.

On April 28, 2021, he took the challenge of coaching Unión San Felipe as a caretaker manager after Tomás Arrotea was released, being later ratified on 26 May 26, 2021, and released on August of the same year.

For the 2023 season, he signed with Santiago City FC in the Chilean Tercera A.

Personal life
His cousin-nephew, Diego Abarca, is an American footballer who is the son of his cousin, Sandra Ramírez, and the former Chilean professional footballer José Abarca.

Honours

Club
Universidad Católica
 Primera División de Chile: 2002 Apertura

References

External links

Living people
1978 births
People from Ovalle
Chilean footballers
Association football midfielders
Chile international footballers
Unión Española footballers
Club Deportivo Universidad Católica footballers
Feyenoord players
RBC Roosendaal players
Universidad de Chile footballers
Mamelodi Sundowns F.C. players
Ñublense footballers
Unión San Felipe footballers
Rangers de Talca footballers
Cobresal footballers
Chilean Primera División players
Eredivisie players
Primera B de Chile players
Chilean expatriate footballers
Chilean expatriate sportspeople in the Netherlands
Expatriate footballers in the Netherlands
Chilean expatriate sportspeople in South Africa
Expatriate soccer players in South Africa
Chilean football managers
Primera B de Chile managers
Unión San Felipe managers